Kholopovo is a rural locality (a village) in Andreyevskoye Rural Settlement, Alexandrovsky District, Vladimir Oblast, Russia. The population was 97 as of 2010. There is 1 street.

Geography 
Kholopovo is located on the Seraya River, 5 km southeast of Alexandrov (the district's administrative centre) by road. Cheryomushki is the nearest rural locality.

References 

Rural localities in Alexandrovsky District, Vladimir Oblast